Barn Jams are a series of instrumental pieces written by Pink Floyd guitarist, David Gilmour and performed by him and the core members of his 2006 On an Island Tour band, Guy Pratt on bass, Richard Wright on keyboards and Steve DiStanislao on drums. The sessions were recorded and filmed in a barn at Gilmour's home in Sussex, in January 2007. It is unknown how many pieces exist, although Gilmour himself, in a bonus interview within the second DVD of his 2008 release Live in Gdańsk, claims that he and guitarist Phil Manzanera (who co-produced the On an Island album) recorded and catalogued "close to 200" jams.  Three tracks were released as part of the Live in Gdańsk 4-disc edition, deluxe edition and vinyl edition; one was released on Remember That Night (2007) and four more were released on the deluxe edition of Gilmour's 2015 Rattle That Lock album. The Barn Jams are the last released recordings made by Richard Wright before his death in 2008.

Currently known "Barn Jams"

Remember That Night

"Island Jam 2007" (Gilmour)
Not to be confused with "Island Jam", the b-side to the "Smile" single. "Island Jam 2007" is another jam recorded during the same sessions as the Barn Jams in January 2007.

Live in Gdańsk
The following Barn Jams were included as videos on Disc 4 of the 4-disc edition and deluxe edition and as audio tracks on the 5 LP vinyl edition of Live in Gdańsk.

"Barn Jam 166" (4:49) (Gilmour)
"Barn Jam 192" (2:49) (Gilmour) (not included on vinyl edition)
"Barn Jam 121" (7:32) (Gilmour)

Rattle That Lock
The following Barn Jams are included as videos in the CD/Blu-ray and CD/DVD deluxe editions of Rattle That Lock.

"Barn Jam 1" (Gilmour)
"Barn Jam 2" (Gilmour)
"Barn Jam 3" (Gilmour)
"Barn Jam 4" (Gilmour)

Personnel

David Gilmour - guitars, console steel guitar, drums on "192"
Richard Wright - keyboards
Guy Pratt - bass guitar, guitar on "192"
Steve DiStanislao - drums, double bass on "192"

References 

David Gilmour songs
Richard Wright (musician) songs